Jack Riley may refer to:
Jack Riley (actor) (1935–2016), American comedic character actor
Jack Riley (American football) (1909–1993), American football offensive tackle 
Jack Riley (ice hockey, born 1910) (1910–1993), former National Hockey League player
Jack Riley (ice hockey, born 1919) (1919–2016), former National Hockey League executive
John P. Riley Jr. (1920–2016), known as Jack Riley, U.S. Military Academy ice hockey coach
Jack Riley (cricketer) (1927–2008), English cricketer
Jack Riley (rugby league), English professional rugby league footballer who played in the 1900s
Jack Riley (baseball), American baseball player

See also
Jack Reilly (disambiguation)
John Riley (disambiguation)